The Paris Go Tournament is a Go tournament organized by the French Go Federation.

The Pandanet Go European Finals were also held during the tournament, from 2008 to 2011.

Awards (from 1979)

See also 
 
 List of Go organizations

References 

Go competitions in Europe
Recurring sporting events established in 1972